Lake Zimbambo is a lake in the Malemba-Nkulu Territory of Haut-Lomami Province, in the southern Democratic Republic of the Congo. 

It is one of the lakes in the Upemba Depression, an extensive marshy area.

The Lualaba River enters the depression about  after leaving Lake Delcommune.

The river generally flows through the marshes between the lakes, to which it is connected by narrow channels.

References

Zimb
Haut-Lomami